John Frazier (born September 23, 1944) is an American visual effects supervisor.

He was born in Chicago, Illinois.

He has 11 Oscar nominations, with one win for Spider-Man 2 at the 77th Academy Awards. He shared the award with John Dykstra, Scott Stokdyk and Anthony LaMolinara.

References

Visual effects supervisors
Living people
1944 births
Best Visual Effects Academy Award winners
Best Visual Effects BAFTA Award winners